This is a list of mosques in the city of Lahore, Pakistan. This city has remained capital of Delhi Sultanate and Mughal Empire at various times, thus hosting multiple  mosques from that era.

Pre Mughal Mosques
 Neevin Mosque, 1460 CE

Mughal Mosques

 Begum Shahi Mosque, 1614 CE
 Dai Anga Mosque, 1635 CE
 Moti Mosque, 1635 CE
 Wazir Khan Mosque, 1642 CE
 Badshahi Mosque, 1673 CE
 Suneri Mosque, 1753 CE
 Shaheed Ganj Mosque, 1753 CE
 Oonchi Mosque

Post Independence Mosques

 Grand Jamia Mosque, Lahore, 2014 
 Data Durbar Complex, 1978 CE
 Shab Bhar Mosque, 1917 
 Shia Mosque
 Jamia Mosque Qudas Ahlehadees, Lahore

See also

 Temples in Lahore

 01
Lahore-related lists
Lists of religious buildings and structures in Pakistan
Lahore
Lists of mosques in Pakistan